Jessica S. Andersen (born 1973) is an American writer. Since 2001, she has published over forty books in romance, mystery and science genres. Andersen holds a PhD in Genetics from Tufts University.

Biography
Born in 1973, Andersen was born and raised in eastern Massachusetts, United States.

Andersen received an undergraduate degree in biology from Tufts University, and then completed a PhD in genetics.

Before beginning to write full time, Andersen worked as a patent agent at the U.S. Patent an Trademark Office, a freelance editor, landscaper and a professional horse trainer and riding coach.

Bibliography

Single novels
 The Stable Affair  (Ltdbooks 2002 )
 The Guardian of the Amulets, 2003
 Bullseye, September 2005 also in Silent Awakening
 Red Alert, January 2006
 Under the Microscope, January 2007
 Prescription: Makeover, April 2007
 Classified Baby, August 2007
 Meet Me at Midnight, September 2007
 Twin Targets, 2008 also in Lord of the Wolfyn
 Snowed in With the Boss, March 2009
 Book 3 of Kenner County Crime Unit
 Internal Affairs, October 2009
 With the MD … at the Altar?, June 2008 also in The Heart of Brody Mcquade
 Under the Microscope, January 2007
 Protector of One also in Internal Affairs
 Doctor's Orders

Dolphin Friendly series
 Dolphin Friendly, February 2003
 Seal with a Kiss, December 2003

Bear Claw Creek Crime Lab series
 Ricochet, April 2006
 At Close Range April 2006
 Rapid Fire, July 2006
 Manhunt in the Wild West, 2008
 Mountain Investigation, 2009
 Internal Affairs, 2009
 Bear Claw Conspiracy, 2011 also in Man With the Muscle
 Bear Claw Bodyguard, 2011 also in Black Ops Bodyguard
 Bear Claw Lawman, 2012

Boston General series
 Dr. Bodyguard, October 2003
 Secret Witness, March 2004 also in Heart of a Hunter
 Intensive Care, August 2004 also in Bulletproof Billionaire
 Body Search, December 2004
 Covert M.D., March 2005 also in Someone Safe
 Sheriff's Daughter, June 2005 also in Bounty Hunter Honor

The Final Prophecy series
1. Night Keepers, June 2008
2. Dawn Keepers, January 2009
3. Sky Keepers, August 2009
4. Demon Keepers, April 2010
5. Blood Spells, November 2010
5.1. Crystal Skull in On the Hunt
6. Storm Kissed, June 2011
7. Magic Unchained, April 2012
8. Spellfire, 2012

Royal House of Shadows
A series of 4 books each by a different author
 Lord of the Vampires by Gena Showalter (August 2011) 
 Lord of Rage by Jill Monroe (September 2011) 
 Lord of the Wolfyn by Jessica Andersen (October 2011) 
 Lord of the Abyss by Nalini Singh (December 2011)

Anthologies and collections

References and sources

External links
 

1973 births
Living people
American romantic fiction writers
Tufts University School of Arts and Sciences alumni
21st-century American novelists
American women novelists
21st-century American women writers
Women romantic fiction writers